Phew is a Japanese singer and analogue electronics improviser working in the areas of experimental and avant-garde music.

Music career

Her career began as a member of post-punk group Aunt Sally, who released a self-titled album on Osaka’s Vanity Records in 1979.

After the break-up of Aunt Sally, she released the "Finale"/"Urahara" single produced by composer Ryuichi Sakamoto, followed by the Phew album recorded at Conny Plank's studio in Cologne, with Holger Czukay and Jaki Liebezeit.  This was followed by a series of albums that included Our Likeness, recorded with Plank and Liebezeit, featuring Einstürzende Neubauten's Alexander Hacke and D.A.F/Liaisons Dangereuses's Chrislo Haas. 

After 1995's Himitsu No Knife, she remained active in various groups, including the jam rock ensemble Novo Tono featuring Otomo Yoshihide, a collaboration with electronic musician Hiroyuki Nagashima called Big Picture, and the punk group Most with Boredoms guitarist Seiichi Yamamoto.  In 2010, she returned to her solo career with the covers album Five Fingered Discount on her own Bereket label, featuring Jim O'Rourke.

From 2012 she began to work in electronic music and home recordings which gave rise to a prolific series of records, starting with 2015's A New World and continuing with 2017's Light Sleep and 2018's Voice Hardcore. In 2018 she also released Island, a collaboration with Raincoats' Ana da Silva.

By the time of 2021's New Decade, she was receiving widespread acclaim for her long career in experimental music.

Discography

Solo 
 New Decade (LP/CD) Mute (2021)
 Voice Hardcore (LP) Mesh-Key (19 Jan 2018 in US)
 Voice Hardcore (CD) Bereket (1 Nov 2017 in Japan)
 Light Sleep (LP) Mesh-Key 2017
 A New World (CD) Felicity 2015
 Five Finger Discount (CD) Bereket 2010
 Himitsu no Knife (CD) Alida 1995
 Our Likeness (LP/CD) Mute 1992
 Songs (Maxi-Single) 1991
 View (LP/CD) 1987
 Phew(LP/CD) Pass Records 1981
 Finale c/w Urahara (Single) Pass Records 1980

Aunt Sally
 Self-titled (LP) Vanity Records 1979 - Reissued on Mesh-Key (2022)

Most
 Most. P-Vine, PCD-25010, 2003
 Most. P-Vine, PCD-5647, 2001
 Most. 2000.11.26. CD-R. 2001

With bands and projects
 Patience Soup with Jim O'Rourke and Oren Ambarchi (LP) Black Truffle 2019
 Island with Ana da Silva (LP) (28 September shouting out loud! 2018) 
 Island with Ana da Silva (CD) only (5 September NEWWHERE MUSIC 2018) 
 Project Undark Radium Girls 2011 with Erika Kobayashi (CD) Bereket 2012
 Morio Agata. Norimono Zukan. Bridge BRIDGE-078, 2007
 Morio Agata. Norimono Zukan. Vanity 0005, 1980
 Big Picture. Big Picture. Little More, LMCA-1002, 2001
 Big Picture. Big Picture. CD-R
 Blind Light. The Absence of Time. Alida, ALIDA-001, 1994
 Anton Fier. Dreamspeed/Blind Light 1992–1994. 2-CD set Tzadik, TZ 7609 2003
 Anton Fier. Dreamspeed. Avant, AVAN-009, 1993
 Novo Tono. Live. CD-R. 2001
 Novo Tono. Panorama Paradise. Alida/Creativeman, CMDD-00038, 1996
 Otomo Yoshihide's New Jazz Ensemble. Dreams. Tzadik, TZ 7238, 2002
 Otomo Yoshihide. Otomo Yoshihide Plays the Music of Takeo Yamashita. P-Vine, PCD-5804, 1999
 The Unknown Cases, and Phew. Koyasan. Fünfundvierzig, MCD 45122, 2001
 Phew and Seiichi Yamamoto. Shiawase no Sumika. Tokuma Japan Communications, TKCH-71454, 1998

Compilations
 Pass No Past. 2-CD set Pass/P-Vine, SSAP-004/5, 2005
 Improvised Music from Japan. 10-CD set. Improvised Music from Japan, IMJ-10CD, 2001
 Mottomo Otomo: Unlimited XIII. Trost, TR076, 2000
 Megabank Presents Tribute to New Wave. Megabank, MB-2.507CD, 1995
 Rebel Incorporated. 2-LP set, Wax, 17WXL-3001/3002; CD, Wax, 32WXD-101

References

External links
Official
Official Twitter
Discogs
1995 interview

1959 births
Living people
Japanese women singers
Musicians from Osaka
Women punk rock singers